Knockavilla is a small village in County Cork, Ireland, a few of kilometres from Crossbarry and Innishannon. The local Roman Catholic church is dedicated to Saint Patrick. There is also a school, a pub, a graveyard, and a community hall (situated next to St. Patrick's church). Knockavilla Celtic is the local association football club.

Location
The village of Knockavilla is located in the electoral division of Knockavilla (sometimes spelled Knockavilly), and a civil parish of the same name.

Knockavilla lies on a hill in the northern part of the Roman Catholic parish of Innishannon-Knockavilla, to the north and west of the neighbouring villages of Innishannon and Crossbarry. 

A large hillfort, Knockavilla or Clashanimud hillfort, overlooks the area.

Amenities
The Roman Catholic church in Knockavilla, Saint Patrick's Church, dates from 1790. It was renovated in 2007 and 2008.

Knockavilla is served by a national (primary) school. Knockavilla National School, also known as Scoil Mhaoilíosa, was built in 1973 and had approximately 150 pupils enrolled as of the 2020 school year. The school was previously housed in what is now the parish hall.

See also
 List of towns and villages in Ireland

References

External links
 Scoil Mhaoilíosa

Towns and villages in County Cork